This is a list of winners and nominees for the BAFTA Award for Best Costume Design, which is presented to costume designers, given out by the British Academy of Film and Television Arts since 1965.

Winners and nominees

1960s
Best British Costume Design – Black and White

Best British Costume Design – Colour

Best Costume Design

1970s

1980s

1990s

2000s

2010s

2020s

See also
 Saturn Award for Best Costume Design
 Satellite Award for Best Costume Design
 Academy Award for Best Costume Design
 Critics' Choice Movie Award for Best Costume Design
 Costume Designers Guild Award for Excellence in Period Film
 Costume Designers Guild Award for Excellence in Fantasy Film
 Costume Designers Guild Award for Excellence in Contemporary Film

References

British Academy Film Awards
 
Awards for film costume design